Microcerotermes cylindriceps, is a species of small termite of the genus Microcerotermes. It is found from Pankulum area of Sri Lanka.

References

External links
Evolution and Systematic Significance of Wing Micro-sculpturing

Termites
Insects described in 1902